The 1999 Gold Flake Open was a men's tennis tournament played on outdoor hard courts in Chennai, India, that was part of the World Series of the 1999 ATP Tour. It was the fourth edition of the tournament and was held from 5 April until 12 April 1999. Fourth-seeded Byron Black won the singles title.

Finals

Singles

 Byron Black defeated  Rainer Schüttler, 6–4, 1–6, 6–3.
 It was Black's 1st title of the year and the 18th of his career.

Doubles

 Leander Paes /  Mahesh Bhupathi defeated  Wayne Black /  Neville Godwin, 4–6, 7–5, 6–4.
 It was Paes's 2nd title of the year and the 15th of his career. It was Bhupathi's 2nd title of the year and the 13th of his career.

References

External links
 ITF tournament edition details

 

 
Chennai Open
Chennai Open
Chennai Open